Samuel Messam (born 2 March 1986) is a New Zealand Association football player who plays for St. George Saints Football Club and has represented New Zealand at the Olympic Games.

Messam was included in the New Zealand squad for the football tournament at the Summer Olympics in Beijing where he played in just one of New Zealand's group matches, a 0–1 loss Belgium.

Messam was signed by New South Wales Premier League Club APIA Leichhardt for the 2011 season .

References

http://www.nswpl.com.au/index.php?id=554&tx_ttnews[tt_news]=4650&tx_ttnews[backPid]=537&cHash=e08d4b0874

External links
 

1986 births
Living people
New Zealand association footballers
Olympic association footballers of New Zealand
Footballers at the 2008 Summer Olympics
Association football forwards